The 2014 FC Tobol season was the 16th successive season that the club playing in the Kazakhstan Premier League, the highest tier of association football in Kazakhstan. Tobol finished the season in 7th position, whilst also reaching the Quarter-finals of the Kazakhstan Cup, where they lost to Astana.

Squad

Transfers

Winter

In:

Out:

Summer

In:

Out:

Competitions

Kazakhstan Premier League

First round

Results summary

Results

League table

Relegation Round

Results summary

Results

Table

Kazakhstan Cup

Squad statistics

Appearances and goals

|-
|colspan="14"|Players who appeared for Tobol that left during the season:

|}

Goal scorers

Disciplinary record

References

External links
 Official Site

Tobol
FC Tobol seasons